Maarit Kallio (born 8 October 1975) is a Finnish judoka. She competed in the women's extra-lightweight event at the 2000 Summer Olympics.

References

External links
 

1975 births
Living people
Finnish female judoka
Olympic judoka of Finland
Judoka at the 2000 Summer Olympics
People from Hämeenlinna
Sportspeople from Kanta-Häme